Bead game may refer to:
 Bead Game, an animated short by Ishu Patel
 The Glass Bead Game, the last work of Hermann Hesse
 The Glass Bead Game (album), the seventh studio album from James Blackshaw